Srikalahasti railway station (station code:KHT) is an Indian railway station in Srikalahasti town of Andhra Pradesh. It lies on the Gudur–Katpadi branch line and is administered under Guntakal railway division of South Coast Railway zone.

Classification

Srikalahasti railway station is classified as a B–category station in the Guntakal railway division.

References

Railway stations in Tirupati district
Guntakal railway division